Yusheng is a Cantonese-style raw fish salad.

Yusheng may also refer to:

Automobiles
 BAW Yusheng, a 2010–present Chinese compact SUV
 JMC Yusheng, a Chinese sub-brand of vehicles by JMC
 Yusheng S350, a 2010–present Chinese mid-size SUV, formerly called JMC Yusheng before 2016

People
 Chang Yu-sheng (1966–1997), Taiwanese singer
 Liang Yusheng (1924–2009), pen name of Chinese writer Chen Wentong
Du Yusheng, current world record holder for the fastest time to solve a Rubiks Cube.